Bill Johnston (born 1960) is a prolific Polish language literary translator and professor of comparative literature at Indiana University. His work has helped to expose English-speaking readers to classic and contemporary Polish poetry and fiction. In 2008 he received the Found in Translation Award for his translation of new poems by Tadeusz Różewicz; this book was also a finalist for the National Books Critics Circle Poetry Award.

In 1999, he was awarded a National Endowment for the Arts Creative Writing Fellowship for Poetry (Translation) for Balladina by Juliusz Słowacki, and in 2005 he received a National Endowment for the Humanities Fellowship for a translation of The Coming Spring by Stefan Żeromski. He is a recipient of the Amicus Poloniae award, presented by the Ambassador of the Republic of Poland (2003), the Diploma of the Polish Foreign Ministry (2004), and the Officer's Order of Merit of the Republic of Poland (2012) for outstanding contribution to the promotion of the Polish culture and language in the U.S., as well as the development of Polish-American cultural cooperation. In 2005, his translation of Magdalena Tulli's Dreams and Stones won the Translation Award of AATSEEL (American Association of Teachers of Slavic and East European Languages). His translation of Stone Upon Stone by Wiesław Myśliwski won the 2012 PEN Translation Prize, the 2012 Best Translated Book Award and the AATSEEL Book Award for Best Literary Translation into English.

Johnston read Modern Languages at the University of Oxford (University College) and graduated in 1982. He earned his Ph.D in Second Language Acquisition from the University of Hawai’i at Mānoa.

Translations

Books
 Adam Mickiewicz: Pan Tadeusz. New York: Archipelago Books. 2018.
 Julia Fiedorczuk: Selected Poems. Brookline, MA; Zephyr Books. In progress.
 Tomasz Różycki: Twelve Stations. Brookline, MA: Zephyr Books. 2015.
 Stanisław Lem: The Invincible. Pro Auctore. 2014.
 Wiesław Myśliwski: A Treatise on Shelling Beans. New York: Archipelago Books. 2013. (shortlisted for the National Translation Award)
 Magdalena Tulli: In Red. New York: Archipelago Books. 2011. (shortlisted for Best Translated Book Award 2012: Fiction)
 Andrzej Stasiuk: Dukla. Champaign, IL: Dalkey Archive. 2011.
 Stanisław Lem: Solaris. Newark, New Jersey: Audible.com (audiobook). 2011.
 Wiesław Myśliwski: Stone Upon Stone. New York: Archipelago Books. 
 Andrzej Stasiuk: Fado. Champaign, IL: Dalkey Archive Press. 
 Juliusz Słowacki: Balladina. Newcastle upon Tyne: Cambridge Scholars Publishing. 
 Jerzy Pilch: The Mighty Angel. Rochester, NY: Open Letter. 
 Eugeniusz Tkaczyszyn-Dycki: Peregrinary. Brookline, MA: Zephyr Books. 2008.
 Magdalena Tulli: Flaw. New York, NY: Archipelago Books. 2007.
 Jan Kochanowski: The Envoys. Kraków, Poland: Księgarnia Akademicka. 2007.
 Stefan Żeromski: The Coming Spring. London: Central European University Press. 2007.
 Tadeusz Różewicz: new poems. New York, NY: Archipelago Books. 2007.(winner of 2008 Found in Translation Award)(finalist for the National Book Critics Circle Poetry Award, 2008).
 Andrzej Stasiuk: Nine. New York, NY: Harcourt Brace. 2007.
 "The Song of Igor's Campaign" (from Old Russian). New York, NY: Ugly Duckling Presse. 2006.
 Magdalena Tulli: Moving Parts. New York, NY: Archipelago Books. 2005.
 Krzysztof Kamil Baczyński: White Magic and Other Poems. Los Angeles, CA: Green Integer. 2005.
 Witold Gombrowicz: Polish Memories. New Haven, CT: Yale University Press. 2004.
 Witold Gombrowicz: Bacacay. New York, NY: Archipelago Books. 2004.
 Magdalena Tulli: Dreams and Stones. New York, NY: Archipelago Books. 2004.(winner of 2005 AATSEEL Translation Award)
 Gustaw Herling: The Noonday Cemetery and Other Stories. New York, NY: New Directions. 2003.(LA Times Notable Book of the Year, 2003)
 Jerzy Pilch: His Current Woman. Evanston, IL: Northwestern University Press/Hydra Books. 2002.
 Stefan Żeromski: The Faithful River. Evanston, IL: Northwestern University Press. 1999.
 Andrzej Szczypiorski: The Shadow Catcher. New York: Grove Press. 1997.
 Bolesław Prus: The Sins of Childhood and Other Stories. Evanston, IL: Northwestern University Press. 1996.
 Maria Hochberg-Mariańska and Noe Grüss (Eds.): The Children Accuse. London: Vallentine Mitchell. 1996.
 Andrzej Szczypiorski: Self-Portrait with Woman. New York: Grove Press. 1995.

Short pieces 
 Andrzej Stasiuk: Dog. In New England Review, forthcoming.
 Magdalena Tulli: What is Art For? (Interview). In The White Review, January 2015.
 Julia Fiedorczuk: Five Poems. World Literature Today, November–December 2014. pp. 30–32.
 Andrzej Stasiuk: Asia: Shade and Shadow. In Continents, February 2014.
 Andrzej Stasiuk: Kyrgyzstan. Words Without Borders, January 2014. 
 Tomasz Różycki: A Grandson Returns. In Little Star 4, 144-177. 2012.
 Stanisław Lem: A Puzzle. In VICE, 19/9. 2012.
 Andrzej Stasiuk: Lublin. In Citybooks. 2012.
 Wiesław Myśliwski: Stone Upon Stone (extract). Absinthe, 14, 10-24. 2011.
 Teatr Ósmego Dnia: The Files (play). To appear in: Carol Martin & Richard Schechner (Eds.), In Performance. New York: Seagull Books. In press.
 Andrzej Stasiuk: Dukla (extract). Words Without Borders, 2010.
 Julia Fiedorczuk: Five poems. In PRECIPICe, 3/1-2, 2009.
 Dariusz Suska: Fifteen poems. In Jacek Dehnel (Eds.), Six Polish Poets, pp. 46–65. London: Arc Publications. 2008.
 Eugeniusz Tkaczyszyn-Dycki: Five poems. In Modern Poetry in Translation, 3/10, 159–162. 2008.
 Eugeniusz Tkaczyszyn-Dycki: “Carriers on the steps of the cathedral” (poem). In Seneca Review, 38/2, 67. 2008.
 Krzysztof Koehler: Two poems. In: Wayne Miller & Kevin Prufer (Eds.), New European Poets, pp. 181–182. Minneapolis, MN: Graywolf. 2008.
 Eugeniusz Tkaczyszyn-Dycki: Two poems. In: Wayne Miller & Kevin Prufer (Eds.), New European Poets, p. 179. Minneapolis, MN: Graywolf. 2008.
 Magdalena Tulli: Flaw (extract). Edinburgh Review, 121, 84–90. 2007.
 Magdalena Tulli: Blemish (aka Flaw) (extract). Agni, 65, 180–188. 2007.
 Tadeusz Różewicz: words (poem). The Nation, February 22, 2007, p. 34.
 Juliusz Słowacki: Balladina (extract). Przekładaniec, 2/2005, 40–63.
 Tadeusz Różewicz: Four poems. Words without Borders, September 2005.
 Eugeniusz Tkaczyszyn-Dycki: three poems. Words without Borders, September 2005.
 Andrzej Sosnowski: From "Zoom". Lyric Review, 8, pp. 66–69. 2005.
 Eugeniusz Tkaczyszyn-Dycki: Two poems. Lyric Review, 8, pp. 79. 2005.
 Krzysztof Koehler: "Mass at Four". Lyric Review, 8, pp. 36–40. 2005.
 Julia Fiedorczuk: "While for those who yearn". Lyric Review, 8, pp. 16. 2005.
 Wojciech Bonowicz: Three poems. Lyric Review, 8, pp. 13–14. 2005.
 Magdalena Tulli: Parts of Speech (Moving Parts) (extract). Agni, 61, pp. 208–222. 2005.
 Magdalena Tulli: Parts of Speech (Moving Parts) (extract). Ninth Letter, 2/1, 17–21. 2005.
 Witold Gombrowicz: Polish Memories (extract). Theater Magazine, 34/3, pp. 34–63. 2004.
 Witold Gombrowicz: The Memoirs of Stefan Czarniecki. Georgia Review, 58/3, pp. 670–681. 2004.
 Witold Gombrowicz: The Rat. New England Review, 25/1-2, pp. 78–86.
 Witold Gombrowicz: Adventures. Words Without Borders, August 2004.
 Jerzy Pilch: The Mighty Angel (extract). Words Without Borders, March 2004. At: 
 Magdalena Tulli: Dreams and Stones (extract). ). Words Without Borders, March 2004.
 Mariusz Grzebalski: Six poems. In M. Baran (Ed.): Carnivorous Boy and Carnivorous Bird: Poems by Polish Poets Born After 1958, pp, 297–307. Brookline, MA: Zephyr Press. 2004.
 Krzysztof Koehler: Six poems. In M. Baran (Ed.): Carnivorous Boy and Carnivorous Bird: Poems by Polish Poets Born After 1958, pp. 147–159. Brookline, MA: Zephyr Press. 2004.
 Tadeusz Pióro: Four poems. In M. Baran (Ed.): Carnivorous Boy and Carnivorous Bird: Poems by Polish Poets Born After 1958, pp. 58–65. Brookline, MA: Zephyr Press. 2004.
 Johnston, B. Introduction: The poetry of Krzysztof Kamil Baczyński. In Krzysztof Kamil Baczyński, White Magic and Other Poems (B. Johnston, trans.). Los Angeles, CA: Green Integer. In press.
 Krzysztof Kamil Baczyński: Three poems. Mr. Knife, Miss Fork, no. 2: an Anthology of International Poetry, August 2003.
 Jerzy Pilch: Old Kubica and the darkness; Filarecka St. Przekadaniec, special issue 2001, pp. 124–134.
 Magdalena Tulli: In Red (extract). Przekładaniec, special issue 2001, pp. 210–224.
 Mariusz Grzebalski: Two poems. Przekładaniec, special issue 2001, pp. 236–239.
 Krzysztof Koehler: Three poems. Przekładaniec, special issue 2001, pp. 190–195.
 Jerzy Pilch: Filarecka St. (extract from essay). Aufbau, 20, October 2000.
 Jerzy Pilch: Heart in mouth (essay). Chicago Review, 46/3–4, pp. 285–290. 2000.
 Włodzimierz Odojewski: Extract from Oksana. Chicago Review, 46/3–4, pp. 126–130. 2000.
 Magdalena Tulli: Extract from In Red. Chicago Review, 46/3–4, pp. 255–262. 2000.
 Tadeusz Pióro: Two poems. Chicago Review, 46/3–4, pp. 222–223. 2000.
 Krzysztof Koehler: Crucifixion (poem). Two Lines: Crossings, pp. 98–101. 2000.
 Krzysztof Kamil Baczyński: Five poems. Przekładaniec, 6, pp. 32–41. 2000.
 Jerzy Pilch: Other Pleasures (chs. 1, 3, 13). Partisan Review, 67/1, pp. 72–82. 2000.
 Jerzy Pilch: Other Pleasures (chs. 4-6). 2B, 14, pp. 201–210. 1999.
 Lech Wałęsa: Letter to my grandson. In Liv Ullman (Ed.), Letter to my Grandchild (pp. 106–107). New York: Grove Press. 1998.
 Krzysztof Kamil Baczyński: Evil lullaby (poem). eXchanges, 10, pp. 90–91. 1998.
 Adam Zagajewski: Długa Street. TriQuarterly, 100, pp. 288–294. 1997.

Major awards & honors 
 2014–2017: Henry Remak Endowed Professorship, Indiana University
 2014: Transatlantyk Prize for the promotion of Polish literature abroad
 2014: Tadeusz Walendowski Prize, awarded by the Polish Library in Washington
 2014: Wiesław Myśliwski’s A Treatise on Shelling Beans shortlisted for the National Translation Award
 2013–2014: Guggenheim Foundation Fellowship
 2013: Lannan Foundation Residency
 2012: AATSEEL (American Association of Teachers of Slavic and East European Languages) Award for Best Literary Translation into English, for Stone Upon Stone by Wiesław Myśliwski
 2012: Officer's Cross of the Order of Merit, awarded by the President of the Republic of Poland
 2012: AATSEEL Translation Award for Wiesław Myśliwski's Stone Upon Stone
 2012: PEN Translation Prize for Wiesław Myśliwski's Stone Upon Stone
 2012: Best Translated Book Award (Fiction) for Wiesław Myśliwski's Stone Upon Stone
 2012: Magdalena Tulli’s In Red shortlisted for Best Translated Book Award (Fiction)
 2010: Jerzy Pilch’s The Mighty Angel long-listed for Best Translated Book Award (Fiction)
 2009: Eugeniusz Tkaczyszyn-Dycki’s Peregrinary a finalist for Best Translated Book Award (Poetry)
 2008: Found in Translation Award for new poems by Tadeusz Różewicz
 2008: Tadeusz Różewicz's new poems a finalist for the National Books Critics Circle Poetry Award.\
 2005: Translation Prize of AATSEEL (American Association of Teachers of Slavic and East European Languages) for Dreams and Stones by Magdalena Tulli
 2005: National Endowment for the Humanities Fellowship, for a translation of The Coming Spring by Stefan Żeromski
 2004: Diploma of the Polish Foreign Ministry
 2003: Amicus Poloniae award, presented by the Ambassador of the Republic of Poland
 1999–2001: National Endowment for the Arts Creative Writing Fellowship for Poetry (Translation) for Balladina by Juliusz Słowacki

References

American translators
Living people
1960 births